João Gerdau (born Johannes Heinrich Kaspar Gerdau, 1849-1917) was a German-born Brazilian businessman and the founder of the steel company Gerdau.

In 1869, Gerdau emigrated to southern Brazil, and in 1901, bought a nail factory in Porto Alegre.

His son Hugo Gerdau inherited the business, and in turn, passed it to his son-in-law Curt Johannpeter in 1946. It is now controlled by his fours sons, Klaus Gerdau Johannpeter, Germano Hugo Gerdau Johannpeter, Frederico Carlos Gerdau Johannpeter and Jorge Gerdau Johannpeter, and their families.

References

1849 births
1917 deaths
Gerdau family
Brazilian businesspeople
Brazilian company founders
German emigrants to Brazil